Daniel Petric (born August 24, 1991) is a convicted murderer from Wellington, Ohio. At age 16, he shot both of his parents after his father confiscated his copy of the video game Halo 3. His mother died, but his father managed to recover from a critical injury. He is incarcerated for life, with a chance for parole. Studies of video game addiction or the effects of violent video games on society, as well as gun control, often mention Daniel Petric.

Background
Daniel Petric, nicknamed Danny, was a teenager who attended high school in Wellington, Ohio. While his home was in nearby Brighton Township, news reports more often identify him as being from Wellington. His father Mark Petric was a Pentecostal minister at the New Life Assembly of God, in Wellington, and his mother was named Susan Petric. According to his father, he had a loving relationship with both of his parents. His friends and family described him as a normal and happy teenager, without any psychological problems that would motivate his crimes. One student recalled that he was "friendly and fun to be around". Fellow churchgoers pointed out that he was enthusiastic about the Bible. In terms of academic achievement, he was an average student at his school, and he had no record of suspension. "There's nothing that would profile him as a source of violence", according to his superintendent.

Petric contracted a staphylococcus infection from a snow skiing injury and was housebound for a year while recuperating from severe spinal damage. He was introduced to the Halo games by his friend Jonathan Johnson and developed an addiction where he would "play them seven or eight hours a day at Johnson's house". Halo is a series of violent games about a war with aliens, most of them rated "M" (mature) for adult audiences by the ESRB. Daniel's father disapproved of video game violence. After his son expressed his want to buy the Halo games, he ordered him to stop playing the games or else leave the house. Daniel moved into Johnson's house for the weekend, playing the game with his friend for up to eighteen hours a day with minimal breaks. That was a week before the shooting. He soon bought his own copy of the recently released Halo 3 without his father's knowledge. Finding him bringing it into the house, his father confiscated it and placed it in a safe that also secured a nine-millimeter (9mm) Taurus PT92 handgun.

Shooting

On October 20, 2007, about one week after the game was confiscated, Daniel found his father's key to unlock the safe and stole both the game and the gun. Around 7 PM, Daniel walked up behind his parents while they were sitting on a couch and said, "Would you close your eyes, I have a surprise for you." He proceeded to shoot both of his parents. His father said that "his head went numb and he saw blood pouring down from his skull." Susan Petric died from her gunshot wounds in the head, arms, and chest. Daniel then placed the gun in his father's hand to make the crime look like a murder-suicide, saying to him, "Hey dad, here's your gun. Take it." 

A few minutes later, his sister Heidi and her husband, Andrew Archer, arrived at the house, planning to watch a baseball game together on television. They arrived two hours earlier than was planned. Before they could enter the house, Daniel told them not to come in; he lied that his parents were fighting. Upon hearing groaning, they forced their way through and discovered the aftermath of the shooting. Heidi called the police. Daniel drove away in the family van in an attempt to escape to a friend's house, but he was arrested during the drive.

Trial
Daniel's trial was held from December 15 to 17, 2008 at the Lorain County Court of Common Pleas in Elyria, Ohio. James Burge presided as judge, and the defendant rejected a jury trial. About 25 young people arrived to support Petric. Several of his relatives and friends testified, including his immediate family, Jonathan Johnson, and his grandfather.

At the trial, Daniel was sighted crying. His father was supportive and announced that the young man had come to deeply regret shooting his parents. "He still does not understand why he did something so terrible", Mark Petric said at the trial.

Prosecution case

The prosecutor, Anthony Cillo, portrayed Petric as a heartless killer. He showed no remorse for his actions, so he claimed, and tried to set up the shooting as a suicide. He had planned his crime carefully, knowing that Heidi Archer and her husband planned to enter the house at 9 PM, but his plot was foiled when they arrived two hours early. In a psychological report ordered by the defense, Petric had informed the psychologist that he had planned the murder of his parents for a week.

Defense case

James Kersey represented Petric as the defense attorney. Neither Kersey nor Petric attempted to dispute the facts of the crime; instead, Kersey argued for the insanity defense, video game addiction being the underlying psychiatric condition. Because of the enormous amount of stress put on him due to his severe infection and resultant spinal injury, Daniel Petric was much more susceptible to being influenced by the game, not to mention his youth. Petric, he said, was not in the right state of mind to understand the finality of shooting his parents. In other words, he had been playing violent video games so long that he did not realize that real-life death is permanent. The levels of video games can be replayed over and over again; killed and injured characters, including the player himself, return to their original states at every reset. Daniel Petric, he continued, must have expected that his mother would eventually return to a healthy and normal state, having been immersed in virtual violence so long. 

Kersey disputed the prosecution's assertions about Petric's personality, using the testimony of Petric's family, friends, and acquaintances to contend that he was a typical teenager. The young Petric's addiction was strong enough for him take along a video game of all things while fleeing. To Kersey, Daniel was not a plotting murderer, but someone who spontaneously killed without planning. The defense did not present psychologists for an expert opinion on the mental effects of violent video games.

Conviction

Petric was convicted for aggravated murder, attempted aggravated murder, and tampering with evidence. Due to his age, Petric could not be sentenced to death. The judge sentenced him to life in prison with the possibility of parole after 23 years, which was the minimum sentence. The maximum sentence Petric faced was life in prison without parole, recommended by the prosecuting attorney.

Aftermath

The case has been highlighted in papers and articles regarding video game addiction and video game violence. Halo 3 publisher Microsoft commented briefly to the media, "We are aware of the situation and it is a tragic case." Petric is currently serving his sentence at Grafton Correctional Institution and will be eligible for parole in 2030.

References

External links

Interview with a 21-year-old imprisoned Daniel Petric and his father on the talk show Katie (3.5 minutes)

Living people
1991 births
American male criminals
American people convicted of murder
American prisoners sentenced to life imprisonment
Male murderers
People convicted of murder by Ohio
Prisoners sentenced to life imprisonment by Ohio
People from Wellington, Ohio
Minors convicted of murder
Matricides
2007 murders in the United States
Criminals from Ohio
21st-century American criminals